The Ottoman–Persian War of 1775–1776 was fought between the Ottoman Empire and the Zand dynasty of Persia. The Persians, ruled by Karim Khan and led by his brother Sadeq Khan Zand, invaded southern Iraq and after besieging Basra for a year, took the city from the Ottomans in 1776. The Ottomans, unable to send troops, were dependent on the Mamluk governors to defend that region.

In an attempt to raise troops and provisions for this war, Ottoman Sultan Abdülhamid I, made Suleiman al-Jalili mubayaaci (official of provisions), ordering him to send provisions to Baghdad, which he ignored, instead he restricted merchants from selling their goods. As a result, the Persians held Basra until 1779 when the Ottomans, under Sulayman Agha, retook the city, following Karim Khan's death.

See also
Safavid occupation of Basra
Ottoman–Persian Wars

References

Sources
 
 
 
 Perry, John R., Karīm Khān Zand: a history of Iran, 1747–1779 University of Chicago Press, 1979,  and One World Publications, 2006 .
 Malcolm, John, Sir, The history of Persia, from the most early period to the present time containing an account of the religion, government, usages, and character of the inhabitants of that kingdom in 2 volumes; London : Murray, 1815.; re-published by Adamant Media Corporation  2004 vol 1. ; vol. 2 .
 
 
 

Ottoman–Persian Wars
Conflicts in 1775
Conflicts in 1776
1770s in Iran
1775 in the Ottoman Empire
1776 in the Ottoman Empire
History of Basra
Early Modern history of Iraq
Wars involving the Zand dynasty